

Martin Gareis (6 October 1891  – 26 February 1976) was a German general during World War II who held commands at the divisional, corps and army levels. He was a recipient of the Knight's Cross of the Iron Cross of Nazi Germany.

Awards and decorations

 Knight's Cross of the Iron Cross on 29 November 1943 as Generalleutnant and commander of 98. Infanterie-Division

References

Citations

Bibliography

 

1891 births
1976 deaths
German Army generals of World War II
Generals of Infantry (Wehrmacht)
Recipients of the Gold German Cross
Recipients of the Knight's Cross of the Iron Cross
Recipients of the clasp to the Iron Cross, 1st class
Military personnel from Berlin
German Army personnel of World War I
Recipients of the Order of Michael the Brave